Crossing Delancey is a 1988 American romantic comedy film adapted by  Susan Sandler from her play of the same name, and directed by Joan Micklin Silver. It stars Amy Irving and Peter Riegert. The film also features performances from David Hyde-Pierce, Sylvia Miles and Rosemary Harris. Amy Irving was nominated for a Golden Globe for the film, for Best Actress in a Motion Picture - Comedy or Musical.

Plot
Isabelle Grossman works for a New York bookstore which supports authors through public readings. When author Anton Maes comes to the bookstore to give a reading, he shows an interest in Isabelle, who is enamored with the intellectual world that is very different from her traditional Jewish upbringing.

Isabelle pays frequent visits to her Bubbe (grandmother), Ida, who lives on the Lower East Side of Manhattan. Anxious for her granddaughter to settle down, Ida turns to the local marriage broker. Although shocked and annoyed, Isabelle allows the matchmaker to introduce her in Bubbe’s kitchen to Sam Posner, who owns the nearby pickle shop.

At first Isabelle is not interested in Sam, believing that he is too working-class for her. Instead, she sets her sights on Anton and the New York intelligentsia. But she also feels guilty for how rude she was to Sam, so she tries to make it up to him by setting him up with her girlfriend Marilyn. In the process, she learns that he did not hire a matchmaker out of desperation and in fact has admired Isabelle from afar for several years. She is deeply touched and begins to like him, but it seems Sam has given up on her and starts dating Marilyn.

One day at a store book reading, Sam shows up, as does Anton. Isabelle leaves with Sam, and later agrees to meet him the next day at her Bubbe’s apartment.

After work the next day, however, she is sidelined by Anton and, believing that he is romantically interested in her, goes to his apartment. She discovers instead that Anton wants the convenience of an assistant, not a true partner. Finally seeing through him, the disgusted Isabelle races to her grandmother's apartment late, finding it empty with Ida sleeping on the couch. Heartbroken, she believes she has ruined her chances with the honest and caring Sam. As she cries, Sam enters from the balcony. The two finally are united and Ida feigns confusion, but is gleeful that her plan has succeeded.

Cast

This was Yiddish theatre star Reizl Bozyk’s only film role.

Soundtrack

Crossing Delancey (Original Motion Picture Soundtrack) is the soundtrack album to the motion picture Crossing Delancey, released October 17, 1988.  Instrumental tracks were by Paul Chihara, and songs were performed by (and in some cases written by members of) The Roches.

Suzzy Roche of the Roches played Marilyn, a friend of Isabelle (Irving), in the film. The Roches provided several songs for the soundtrack. One of the songs that was featured in the film, Nocturne, is also featured on the group's 1989 album Speak.  An earlier arrangement of their cover of "Come Softly to Me" is featured on their album Another World.

Track listing
	Come Softly To Me (credited to Gretchen Christopher, Barbara Ellis, and Gary Troxel) 
 	Lucky (written by Terre and David Roche)
	Anton's Theme 
 	Portrait Of Izzy 
 	Anton Again 
 	Come Softly To Me 
 	Sadness 
 	Pounding (written by Terre and Suzzy Roche)
 	Lucky 
 	Portrait Of Anton 
 	Barber Shop 
 	Nocturne (written by Margaret Roche)
 	True Love 
 	Pounding (Terre and Suzzy Roche)
 	Happy Ending 
 	Come Softly To Me

Tracks 1, 2, 6, 8, 9, 12, 14 and 16 are performed by the Roches. 
Tracks 3, 4, 5, 7, 10, 13, 15 composed by Paul Chihara
Track 11 composed by Sergei Prokofiev
All songs arranged and orchestrated by Paul Chihara

Reception
The film received positive reviews. It currently holds an 89% rating on Rotten Tomatoes based on 27 reviews.

One retrospective review from 2018 called Crossing Delancey "the ultimate Jewish rom-com" and a rare great story of "outwardly Jewish love".

Box office
The film was a modest arthouse success.

Accolades

The film is recognized by American Film Institute in these lists:
 2002: AFI's 100 Years...100 Passions – Nominated

References

External links
 
 
 
 
 
 

1988 romantic comedy films
1980s American films
1980s English-language films
American films based on plays
American romantic comedy films
Films about Jews and Judaism
Films directed by Joan Micklin Silver
Films produced by Michael Nozik
Films scored by Paul Chihara
Films set in New York City
Warner Bros. films